The 2009 Kazakhstan Premier League was the 18th season of the Kazakhstan Premier League, the highest football league competition in Kazakhstan. It started on 7 March 2009 and ended in November 2009. Aktobe were the defending champions.

Changes from 2008

Team changes
Energetik-2 were relegated to the First Division after finishing in 14th place. FC Atyrau, who originally were going to be demoted as well, were spared because of the withdrawal of Alma-Ata in December 2008.

Kazakhmys and Taraz finished the 2008 season of the First Division in first two places and were therefore promoted to the Premier League.

After the withdrawal of Alma-Ata, the club merged with fellow Almaty team Megasport to create a new side called Lokomotiv. The club is based in Astana.

On 20 January 2009 Kairat voluntarily withdrew from the league because of financial reasons. On the same day FC Astana-64 also withdrew due to unpaid debts.

Esil Bogatyr were renamed Kyzylzhar.

On 29 January 2009, after two withdrawals, one club merger and one name change, FFK board finally decided that the 2009 season would feature 14 instead of 16 teams.

On 2 March 2009 Kazakhmys withdrew from the league due to financial difficulties caused by global economic crisis. Since there was no time to find a replacement or take any action, FFK board decided that there would be only 13 teams participating in 2009 season of Kazakhstan Premier League. However, on 5 March 2009 Kazakhmys addressed a letter to FFK revoking their decision and stating that they would guarantee financing of the club to participate in the Premier League.

Structural changes
On 20 March 2009, FFK board decided that the 2010 season will feature 12 clubs. The bottom three teams will be directly relegated while the 11th-placed team will play a relegation play-off against the runners-up of the First division.

Team overview

League table

Relegation play-offs
FC Okzhetpes and FC Akzhayik from the First Division competed in a promotion/relegation play-off for one spot in the 2010 season. Akzhayik won 3–2 and were promoted to the Premier League. However, Okzhetpes were spared from relegation as well after the license of Vostok was revoked after the Oskemen club failed to pay all its debts by 30 January 2010.

Results

Top goalscorers 
Updated to games on 25 October; Source: Kazakhstan Football Federation

References

External links
 kff.kz 
 lyakhov.kz 
 soccerway.com
 uefa.com

Kazakhstan Premier League seasons
1
Kazakh
Kazakh